Tynehead railway station served the village of Pathhead, Midlothian, Scotland from 1848 to 1969 on the Waverley Line.

History 

The station opened on 4 August 1848 by the North British Railway. It was situated south of the B6367. The station's original name was Tyne Head, although this was changed to Tynehead in March 1874. The goods yard consisted of three parallel sidings, one serving a cattle dock and a fourth running diagonally across the yard towards the entrance, where there was a weighbridge and weigh office. Goods services ceased on 28 December 1964; the sidings were quickly lifted soon after. On 27 March 1967 the station was downgraded to an unstaffed halt, although the suffix 'halt' never appeared in any of the timetables. The station was closed to passengers and, due to no goods traffic, completely on 6 January 1969.

In September 2015, the Waverley Route partially reopened as part of the Borders Railway. Although the railway passes through the original Tynehead station, it was not reopened.

References

External links 

Disused railway stations in Midlothian
Railway stations in Great Britain opened in 1848
Railway stations in Great Britain closed in 1969
Beeching closures in Scotland
Former North British Railway stations